Álex Valle Gómez (born 25 April 2004) is a Spanish footballer who plays as a left back for FC Andorra, on loan from FC Barcelona.

Club career
Born in Badalona, Barcelona, Catalonia, Valle joined FC Barcelona's La Masia in 2014, from CE Sant Gabriel. He made his senior debut with the reserves on 19 March 2022, starting in a 2–1 Primera División RFEF home win over UE Cornellà.

On 1 November 2022, Valle was named amongst the substitutes in Barcelona's UEFA Champions League match against FC Viktoria Plzeň; he remained unused in the 4–2 away win. The following 31 January, he renewed his contract until 2025, and was immediately loaned to Segunda División side FC Andorra for the remainder of the season.

Valle made his professional debut on 3 March 2023, replacing Jacobo González in a 0–0 home draw against UD Las Palmas.

References

External links

2004 births
Living people
People from Badalona
Spanish footballers
Footballers from Catalonia
Association football defenders
Segunda División players
Primera Federación players
FC Barcelona Atlètic players
FC Andorra players
Spain youth international footballers
Spanish expatriate footballers
Expatriate footballers in Andorra
Spanish expatriate sportspeople in Andorra